Surprises is an album by jazz flautist Herbie Mann featuring singer Cissy Houston which was released on the Atlantic label in 1976.

Reception

The Allmusic site awarded the album 3 stars.

Track listing
All compositions by Herbie Mann except as indicated
"Draw Your Breaks" (Derrick Harriott, David Scott) - 4:50
"Cajun Moon" (JJ Cale) - 6:17
"Creepin" (Stevie Wonder) - 5:00
"Easter Rising" (Pat Rebillot, Pat Kirby) - 4:40
"Asa Branca" (Luiz Gonzaga, Humberto Teixeira, Divina Eulália Oliveira) - 3:55
"The Sound of Windwood" - 2:34
"Cricket Dance" - 4:17
"The Butterfly in a Stone Garden" - 5:19
"Anata (I Wish You Were Here with Me)" (Akiko Kosaka) - 3:07

Personnel
Herbie Mann - flute 
Minoru Muraoka - shakuhachi (track 6)
Yosei Sato - shō (tracks 6 & 8)
David "Fathead" Newman - tenor saxophone (tracks 1-3) 
Pat Rebillot - keyboards 
Gladstone Anderson - piano (track 1)
Winston Wright - organ (track 1)
Hux Brown (track 1), Sam Brown (track 6), Radcliffe "Dougie" Bryan (track 1), Jerry Friedman (tracks 2-4, 7 & 9), Bob Mann (track 3-5, 7 & 8), Hugh McCracken (track 2), Jeff Mironov (track 5) - guitar
Eriko Kuramoto, Harumi Nakamaru, Kazuko Tsubamoto - koto (tracks 6 & 8)
Somei Sasaki - shamisen (tracks 6 & 8)
Bob Babbitt (track 4), Jackie Jackson (track 1) Tony Levin (tracks 2, 3 & 5-9) - bass
Steve Gadd (tracks 2, 3 & 6-9), Rick Marotta (tracks 4 & 5), Michael Richards (track 1) - drums
Raphael Cruz (track 5), Sammy Figueroa (track 5), Armen Halburian (tracks 2-9), Ralph MacDonald (tracks 2 & 3) - percussion 
Seiko Fujisya, Kisaku Katada, Hiromitsu Katada - taiko (tracks 6 & 8)  
Cissy Houston (tracks 1-5), Akiko Kosaka (track 9) - vocals 
Eunice Peterson, Rannelle Braxton - backing vocals (track 1)
David Nadien, Gene Orloff, Guy Lumia, Richard Sortomme - violin (track 4)
Emanuel Vardi, Richard Maximoff - viola (track 4)
Charles McCracken, Jesse Levy - cello (track 4)

Charts

Liner notes
From the liner notes: "Cissy Houston. Only now is she beginning to emerge from her cocoon after so many years with the Drinkards and the Sweet Inspirations. Cissy...is showcased here like a star-in-waiting."

See also

Herbie Mann discography

References

Surprises, Herbie Mann. Atlantic Records SD 1682 (1976) (album cover and liner notes)

External links
Surprises at Allmusic.com

Herbie Mann albums
Atlantic Records albums
Crossover jazz albums
1976 albums